

Mollusks

Gastropods

Archosauromorphs

Newly named dinosaurs
Data courtesy of George Olshevsky's dinosaur genera list.

Newly named birds

Synapsids

Non-mammalian

Mammals

Cetaceans

References

1920s in paleontology
Paleontology
Paleontology 7